Shazma Haleem is a Pakistani actress born in Swabi, Khyber Pakhtunkhwa. She has worked in many TV shows and also got an award from PTV.  She presently hosts a morning show onKhyber TV, and recently acted in television dramas on a few notable local channels. She has three kids, two daughters & one son. 
one of her best performances is in Pushto drama "ASMAN"

References

Living people
Year of birth missing (living people)
People from Swabi District